Simone Bolelli and Fabio Fognini were the defending champions, but lost in the second round to Adrian Mannarino and Lucas Pouille.

Jamie Murray and Bruno Soares won the title, defeating Daniel Nestor and Radek Štěpánek in the final, 2–6, 6–4, 7–5.

Australian Lleyton Hewitt played his final ever professional match in either singles or doubles; partnering Sam Groth, the pair lost to Jack Sock and Vasek Pospisil in the third round.

Seeds

Draw

Finals

Top half

Section 1

Section 2

Bottom half

Section 3

Section 4

References

Draw

External links
 2016 Australian Open – Men's draws and results at the International Tennis Federation

Men's Doubles
Australian Open (tennis) by year – Men's doubles